AMS-55 may refer to:
 USS Seagull (AMS-55), battleship
 NBS AMS 55 aka Abramowitz and Stegun, a mathematics textbook